This article lists the winners and nominees for the Black Reel Award for Television for Outstanding Guest Actor, Comedy Series. 
The category was first introduced as Outstanding Guest Performer, Comedy Series, honoring both actors and actresses in guest starring roles on television. In 2018, the category was split into categories for each gender, resulting in the name change to its current title.

Winners and nominees
Winners are listed first and highlighted in bold.

2010s

2020s

Superlatives

Programs with multiple awards

3 awards
 Saturday Night Live

Performers with multiple awards

2 Wins 
 Dave Chappelle 
 Katt Williams (2 consecutive)

Programs with multiple nominations

10 nominations
 Saturday Night Live

2 nominations
 Insecure

Performers with multiple nominations

3 nominations
 Sterling K. Brown

2 nominations
 Dave Chappelle 
 Katt Williams

Total awards by network
 NBC - 3
 ABC - 1
 FX - 1

References

Black Reel Awards